The Eagle's Wings is a 1916 American silent drama film directed by Robert Z. Leonard and starring Grace Carlyle, Vola Vale and Herbert Rawlinson.

Cast
 Grace Carlyle as Mona Wright
 Vola Vale as 	Kitty Miles 
 Herbert Rawlinson as Richard Wallace
 Charles Hill Mailes as Senator Wright
 Rodney Ronous as Jefferson Maynard
 Charles Gunn as Orlin Dagore
 Albert MacQuarrie as Keron Theris 
 Malcolm Blevins as James Brown
 Walter Belasco as Foreign Ambassador

References

Bibliography
 Codori, Jeff. Film History Through Trade Journal Art, 1916-1920. McFarland, 2020.

External links
 

1916 films
1916 drama films
1910s English-language films
American silent feature films
Silent American drama films
American black-and-white films
Films directed by Robert Z. Leonard
Universal Pictures films
1910s American films